This is a list of law enforcement agencies in the state of Maryland.

According to the US Bureau of Justice Statistics' 2008 Census of State and Local Law Enforcement Agencies, the state had 142 law enforcement agencies employing 16,013 sworn police officers, about 283 for each 100,000 residents.

State agencies 

 Maryland Capitol Police
 Maryland Department of Health and Mental Hygiene Police
 Maryland Department of Labor, Licensing, and Regulation Police
 Maryland Natural Resources Police
 Maryland Motor Vehicle Administration Police Department
 Maryland Office of the Comptroller
 Maryland State Police
 Maryland State Fire Marshal
 Maryland Transit Administration Police
 Maryland Transportation Authority Police
Washington Suburban Sanitary Commission Police
 Maryland Department of Public Safety and Correctional Services

County agencies 

Allegany County Sheriff's Office
Anne Arundel County Police Department
Anne Arundel County Sheriff's Office
Baltimore County Police Department
Baltimore County Sheriff's Office
Calvert County Sheriff's Office
Carroll County Sheriff's Office
Caroline County Sheriff's Department
Cecil County Sheriff's Office

Charles County Sheriff's Office
Dorchester County Sheriff's Office
Frederick County Sheriff's Office
Garrett County Sheriff's Office
Harford County Sheriff's Office
Howard County Police Department
Howard County Sheriff's Office
Kent County Sheriff's Office
Montgomery County Police Department
Montgomery County Sheriff's Office

Prince George's County Police Department
Prince George's County Sheriff's Office
Queen Anne's County Sheriff's Office
St. Mary's County Sheriff's Office
Somerset County Sheriff's Office
Talbot County Sheriff's Office
Washington County Sheriff's Office
Wicomico County Sheriff's Office
Worcester County Sheriff's Office

Municipal agencies 

Aberdeen Police Department
Annapolis Police Department
Baltimore Police Department
Baltimore City Schools Police
Baltimore City Sheriff's Office
Baltimore City Environmental Police
Bel Air Police Department
Berlin Police Department
Berwyn Heights Police Department
Bladensburg Police Department
Boonsboro Police Department
Bowie Police Department
Brentwood Police Department
Brunswick Police Department
Cambridge Police Department
Capitol Heights Police Department
Centreville Police Department
Chestertown Police Department
Cheverly Police Department
Chevy Chase Village Police Department
Colmar Manor Police Department
Cottage City Police Department
Crofton Police Department
Crisfield Police Department
Cumberland Police Department
Delmar Police Department
Denton Police Department

District Heights Police Department
Easton Police Department
Edmonston Police Department
Elkton Police Department
Fairmont Heights Police Department
Federalsburg Police Department
Forest Heights Police Department
Frederick City Police Department 
Frostburg City Police Department
Fruitland Police Department
Gaithersburg Police Department
Gibson Island Police
Glenarden Police Department
Greenbelt Police Department
Greensboro Police Department
Hagerstown Police Department
Hampstead Police Department
Hancock Police Department
Havre De Grace Police Department
Hurlock Police Department
Hyattsville City Police Department
Landover Hills Police Department
La Plata Police Department
Laurel Police Department
Manchester Police Department
Morningside Police Department
Mount Airy Police Department
Mount Rainier Police Department

New Carrollton Police Department
North East Police Department
Oakland Police Department
Ocean City Police Department
Ocean Pines Police Department
Oxford Police Department
Perryville Police Department
Pokomoke City Police Department
Port Deposit Police Department
Princess Anne Police Department
Ridgley Police Department
Rising Sun Police Department
Riverdale Park Police Department
Rockville City Police Department
Rock Hall Police Department
St. Michaels Police Department
Salisbury Police Department
Seat Pleasant Police Department
Smithsburg Police Department
Snow Hill Police Department
Sykesville Police Department
Takoma Park Police Department
Taneytown Police Department
Thurmont Police Department
University Park Police Department
Upper Marlboro Police Department
Westminster Police Department

University agencies 

Anne Arundel Community College, Department of Public Safety & Police
Baltimore City Community College Department of Public Safety
Bowie State University, Department of Public Safety
Breakthrough Bible College Police Office of Law Enforcement & Public Safety
Carroll Community College Campus Police Department
Cecil College Public Safety
Community College of Baltimore County Department of Public Safety
Coppin State University Police Department
Frostburg State University Police Department
Harford Community College Department of Public Safety
Hood College Department of Campus Safety
Johns Hopkins University Campus Safety and Security
Loyola University Maryland Department of Public Safety
McDaniel College Department of Campus Safety & Campus Police Unit
Montgomery College Public Safety 
Morgan State University Police Department
Prince George's Community College Campus Police Department
Salisbury University Police Department

St. Mary's College of Maryland Office of Public Safety
St. Johns College Public Safety 
Towson University Police Department
United States Naval Academy - Naval Support Activity - Annapolis Police 
University of Baltimore Police Department
University of Maryland, Baltimore Police Department
University of Maryland, Baltimore County Police Department
University of Maryland, College Park Police Department
University of Maryland, Eastern Shore Department of Public Safety

Law enforcement units within fire agencies

 Annapolis Fire Department - Office of the Fire Marshal
Bomb Squad
 Anne Arundel County Fire Department - Office of the Fire Marshal
 Montgomery County Fire and Rescue Service - Fire & Explosive Investigations
Bomb Squad
 Prince George's County Fire/EMS Department - Office of the Fire Marshal
Bomb Squad
 Howard County Department of Fire and Rescue - Office of the Fire Marshal
 City of Hagerstown Fire Department - Office of the Fire Marshal
 Ocean City Fire Marshal Office
Bomb Squad

Other agencies 
 Aberdeen Proving Ground Police
 Amtrak Police
 CSX Railroad Police
 Federal Protective Service
 Fort Detrick Police
 Fort Meade Police
 Gibson Island Police
 Maryland-National Capital Park Police
 Metro Transit
 National Institutes of Health Police
 National Institute of Standards and Technology Police
 National Security Agency Police
 Office of the United States Marshal for the District of Maryland
 United States Naval District of Washington Police - Naval Support Activity - Annapolis & US Naval Academy 
 United States Park Police
 United States Special Investigation Service
 National Park Service Ranger (Law Enforcement)
 United States Coast Guard Police Department, Baltimore 
 United States Department of Veterans Affairs Police
 United States Naval District of Washington Police - Naval Support Activity - Bethesda
 United States Naval District of Washington Police - Naval Support Facility - Indian Head
 United States Naval District of Washington Police - Naval Air Station - Patuxent River
 Naval Criminal Investigative Service
 United States Army Criminal Investigations Division Command

Defunct agencies 
Housing Authority of Baltimore City Police Force
 Baltimore City Park Police 
 Barton Police Department
 Charlestown Police Department
 Chesapeake Beach Police Department 
 Clear Spring Police Department
 Emmitsburg Police Department
 Goldsboro Police Department 
 Kitzmiller Police Department  
 Leonardtown Police Department
 Lonaconing Police Department
 Luke Police Department 
 North Beach Police Department
 New Windsor Police Department 
 Sparrows Point Police Department
 Trappe Police Department
 Union Bridge Police Department
 Westernport Police Department 
 Williamsport Police Department 
 Willards Police Department 
 Woodland Beach Police Department
 Allegany County Bureau of Police
 Naval Station Annapolis Police Department (Merged with US Naval Academy PD to form NDW - NSA-Annapolis)
 US Naval Academy Police Department (Merged with NAVSTA Annapolis PD to form NDW - NSA-Annapolis)

See also 
 Maryland Department of Public Safety and Correctional Services

Crime:
 Crime in Maryland

General:
 Law enforcement in the United States

References

Maryland
Law enforcement agencies of Maryland
Law enforcement agencies